Nasser Khalfan (Arabic:ناصر خلفان) (born 17 October 1993) is a Qatari footballer. He currently plays for Al Ahli .

External links

References

Qatari footballers
1993 births
Living people
Al-Arabi SC (Qatar) players
Lekhwiya SC players
Umm Salal SC players
Al-Duhail SC players
Al Ahli SC (Doha) players
Qatar Stars League players
Association football wingers